Pauline Kael (June 19, 1919 – September 3, 2001) was an American film critic who wrote for The New Yorker from 1968 to 1991. Known for her "witty, biting, highly opinionated and sharply focused" reviews, Kael's opinions often ran contrary to those of her contemporaries.

One of the most influential American film critics of her era, she left a lasting impression on the art form. Roger Ebert argued in an obituary that Kael "had a more positive influence on the climate for film in America than any other single person over the last three decades". Kael, he said, "had no theory, no rules, no guidelines, no objective standards. You couldn't apply her 'approach' to a film. With her it was all personal." In a blurb for The Age of Movies, a collection of her writings for the Library of America, Ebert wrote that "Like George Bernard Shaw, she wrote reviews that will be read for their style, humor and energy long after some of their subjects have been forgotten."  Owen Gleiberman said she "was more than a great critic. She reinvented the form, and pioneered an entire aesthetic of writing."

Early life and education 
Kael was born to Isaac Paul Kael and Judith Kael (née Friedman), Jewish emigrants from Poland, on a chicken farm among other Jewish chicken farmers, in Petaluma, California. Her siblings are Louis (1906), Philip (1909), Annie, (1912), and Rose (1913). Her parents lost their farm when Kael was eight, and the family moved to San Francisco. Kael attended high school in San Francisco. In 1936 she matriculated at the University of California, Berkeley, where she studied philosophy, literature, and art, but dropped out in 1940. Kael had intended to go on to law school, but fell in with a group of artists and moved to New York City with the poet Robert Horan.

Three years later, Kael returned to Berkeley and "led a bohemian life," writing plays, and working in experimental film. In 1948, Kael and the filmmaker James Broughton had a daughter, Gina James, whom Kael would raise alone. Gina had a congenital heart defect through much of her childhood, which Kael could not afford the surgery to correct. To support her daughter and herself, Kael worked a series of menial jobs such as cook and seamstress, along with stints as an advertising copywriter.

Early career 
In 1952, Peter D. Martin, the editor of City Lights magazine overheard Kael arguing about films in a coffeeshop with a friend and asked her to review Charlie Chaplin's Limelight. Kael dubbed the film "Slimelight" and began publishing film criticism regularly in magazines.

Kael later explained her writing style: "I worked to loosen my style—to get away from the term-paper pomposity that we learn at college. I wanted the sentences to breathe, to have the sound of a human voice." Kael disparaged the supposed critic's ideal of objectivity, referring to it as "saphead objectivity," and incorporated aspects of autobiography into her criticism. In a review of Vittorio De Sica's 1946 neorealist film Shoeshine that has been ranked among her most memorable, Kael described seeing the film

Kael broadcast many of her early reviews on the alternative public radio station KPFA, in Berkeley, and in 1953, she married Edward Landberg, the owner of the Berkeley Cinema-Guild and Studio. Though their marriage soon ended in divorce, he agreed to pay for Gina's heart surgery, and made Kael the manager of the cinema in 1955, a position she held until 1960. In that role, she programmed the films at the two-screen facility, "unapologetically repeat[ing] her favorites until they also became audience favorites." She also wrote "pungent" capsule reviews of the films, which her patrons began collecting.

Going mass-market
Kael continued to juggle writing with other work until she received an offer to publish a book of her criticism. Published in 1965 as I Lost It at the Movies, the collection sold 150,000 paperback copies and was a surprise bestseller. Coinciding with a job at the high-circulation women's magazine McCall's, Kael (as Newsweek put it in a 1966 profile) "went mass."

That same year, she wrote a blistering review of the phenomenally popular The Sound of Music in McCall's. After mentioning that some of the press had dubbed it "The Sound of Money," Kael called the film's message a "sugarcoated lie that people seem to want to eat." Although according to legend this review led to her being fired from McCall's (and The New York Times printed as much in Kael's obituary), both Kael and the magazine's editor, Robert Stein, denied this. According to Stein, he fired her "months later, after she kept panning every commercial movie from Lawrence of Arabia and Dr. Zhivago to The Pawnbroker and A Hard Day's Night."

Her dismissal from McCall's led to a stint from 1966 to 1967 at The New Republic, whose editors continually altered Kael's writing without her permission. In October 1967, Kael wrote a lengthy essay on Bonnie and Clyde, which the magazine declined to publish. William Shawn of The New Yorker obtained the piece and ran it in the New Yorker issue of October 21. Kael's rave review was at odds with prevailing opinion, which was that the film was inconsistent, blending comedy and violence. According to critic David Thomson, "she was right about a film that had bewildered many other critics." A few months after the essay ran, Kael quit The New Republic "in despair." In 1968, Kael was asked by Shawn to join The New Yorker staff; she alternated as film critic every six months with Penelope Gilliatt until 1979, and became sole critic in 1980 after a year's leave of absence working in the film industry.

New Yorker tenure
Initially, many considered her colloquial, brash writing style an odd fit with the sophisticated and genteel New Yorker. Kael remembered "getting a letter from an eminent New Yorker writer suggesting that I was trampling through the pages of the magazine with cowboy boots covered with dung." During her tenure at the New Yorker, she was able to take advantage of a forum that permitted her to write at length—and with minimal editorial interference—thereby achieving her greatest prominence. By 1968, Time magazine was referring to her as "one of the country's top movie critics."

In 1970, Kael received a George Polk Award for her work as a critic at the New Yorker. She continued to publish collections of her writing with suggestive titles such as Kiss Kiss Bang Bang, When the Lights Go Down, and Taking It All In. Her fourth collection, Deeper into Movies (1973), won the U.S. National Book Award in the Arts and Letters category. It was the first non-fiction book about film to win a National Book Award.

Kael also wrote philosophical essays on movie-going, the modern Hollywood film industry, and what she perceived as the lack of courage on the part of audiences to explore lesser-known, more challenging movies (she rarely used the word "film" to describe films because she felt the word was too elitist). Among her more popular essays were a damning 1973 review of Norman Mailer's semi-fictional Marilyn: a Biography (an account of Marilyn Monroe's life); an incisive 1975 look at Cary Grant's career; and "Raising Kane" (1971), a book-length essay on the authorship of the film Citizen Kane that was the longest piece of sustained writing she had yet done.

Commissioned as an introduction to the shooting script in The Citizen Kane Book, "Raising Kane" was first printed in two consecutive issues of The New Yorker. The essay extended Kael's dispute of the auteur theory, arguing that Herman J. Mankiewicz, co-author of the screenplay, was virtually the sole author of the script and the film's actual guiding force. Kael further alleged that Orson Welles had actively schemed to deprive Mankiewicz of screen credit. Welles considered suing Kael for libel. He was defended by critics, scholars and friends, including Peter Bogdanovich, who rebutted Kael's claims in a 1972 article that included the revelation that Kael had appropriated the extensive research of a UCLA faculty member and did not credit him.

Woody Allen said of Kael, "She has everything that a great critic needs except judgment. And I don't mean that facetiously. She has great passion, terrific wit, wonderful writing style, huge knowledge of film history, but too often what she chooses to extol or fails to see is very surprising."

Kael battled the editors of the New Yorker as much as her own critics. She fought with William Shawn to review the 1972 pornographic film Deep Throat, though she eventually relented. According to Kael, after reading her negative review of Terrence Malick's 1973 film Badlands, Shawn said, "I guess you didn't know that Terry is like a son to me." Kael responded, "Tough shit, Bill," and her review was printed unchanged. Other than sporadic confrontations with Shawn, Kael said she spent most of her work time at home, writing.

Upon the release of Kael's 1980 collection When the Lights Go Down, her New Yorker colleague Renata Adler published an 8,000-word review in The New York Review of Books that dismissed the book as "jarringly, piece by piece, line by line, and without interruption, worthless." Adler argued that Kael's post-1960s work contained "nothing certainly of intelligence or sensibility" and faulted her "quirks [and] mannerisms," including Kael's repeated use of the "bullying" imperative and rhetorical question. The piece quickly became infamous in literary circles and was described by Time magazine as "the New York literary Mafia['s] bloodiest case of assault and battery in years." Although Kael refused to respond, Adler's review became known as "the most sensational attempt on Kael's reputation"; two decades later, Salon.com (ironically) referred to Adler's "worthless" denunciation of Kael as her "most famous single sentence."

In 1979, Kael accepted an offer from Warren Beatty to be a consultant to Paramount Pictures, but left the position after only a few months to return to writing criticism.

Later years
In the early 1980s, Kael was diagnosed with Parkinson's disease, which sometimes has a cognitive component. As her condition worsened, she became increasingly depressed about the state of American films, along with feeling that "I had nothing new to say." In a March 11, 1991, announcement which The New York Times referred to as "earth-shattering," Kael announced her retirement from reviewing films regularly. At the time, Kael explained that she would still write essays for The New Yorker, along with "some reflections and other pieces of writing about movies." Over the next 10 years, however, she published no new work save for an introduction to her 1994 compendium, For Keeps. In the introduction (which was reprinted in The New Yorker), Kael stated, in reference to her film criticism, "I'm frequently asked why I don't write my memoirs. I think I have".

Though she published no new writing of her own, Kael was not averse to giving interviews, occasionally giving her opinion on new films and television shows. In a 1998 interview with Modern Maturity, she said she sometimes regretted not being able to review: "A few years ago when I saw Vanya on 42nd Street, I wanted to blow trumpets. Your trumpets are gone once you've quit." She died at her home in Great Barrington, Massachusetts, on September 3, 2001, at the age of 82.

Opinions
Kael's opinions often ran contrary to the consensus of her fellow critics. Occasionally, she championed films that were considered critical failures, such as The Warriors and Last Tango in Paris. She was not especially cruel to some films that had been deplored by many critics—such as the 1972 Man of La Mancha, in which she praised Sophia Loren's performance. She also panned films that had elsewhere attracted critical admiration, such as Network, A Woman Under the Influence ("murky, ragmop movie"), The Loneliness of the Long Distance Runner, most experimental cinema (calling it "a creature of publicity and mutual congratulations on artistry"), most student films ("freshmen compositions"), It's a Wonderful Life, Shoah ("logy and exhausting"), Dances with Wolves ("a nature boy movie") and 2001: A Space Odyssey, the last of which Kael dubbed a "monumentally unimaginative movie." The originality of her opinions, as well as the forceful way in which she expressed them, won her ardent supporters as well as angry critics and fans.

Kael's reviews included a panning of West Side Story (1961) that drew harsh replies from the film's supporters; ecstatic reviews of Z and MASH that resulted in enormous boosts to those films' popularity; and enthusiastic appraisals of Brian De Palma's early films. Her 'preview' of Robert Altman's film Nashville (1975) appeared in print several months before the film was actually completed, in an attempt to prevent the studio from recutting the film and to catapult it to box-office success.

Kael was an opponent of the auteur theory, criticizing it both in her reviews and in interviews. She preferred to analyze films without thinking about the director's other works. Andrew Sarris, a key proponent of the theory, debated it with Kael in the pages of The New Yorker and various film magazines. Kael argued that a film should be considered a collaborative effort. In "Raising Kane" (1971), an essay she wrote on Orson Welles' Citizen Kane, she points out how the film made extensive use of the distinctive talents of co-writer Herman J. Mankiewicz and cinematographer Gregg Toland.

Views on violence
Kael had a taste for antihero films that violated taboos involving sex and violence; this reportedly alienated some of her readers. However, she panned Midnight Cowboy (1969), the X-rated antihero film that won an Oscar for Best Picture. She also had a strong dislike for films that she felt were manipulative or appealed in superficial ways to conventional attitudes and feelings. She was particularly critical towards Clint Eastwood: her reviews of his films and acting, even if generally well-favored, were resoundingly negative. She became known as his nemesis.

She was an enthusiastic, if occasionally ambivalent, supporter of Sam Peckinpah and Walter Hill's early work, both of whom specialized in violent action dramas. Her collection 5001 Nights at the Movies includes positive reviews of nearly all of Peckinpah's films, with the exception of The Getaway (1972), as well as Hill's Hard Times (1975), The Warriors (1979), and Southern Comfort (1981). Despite her initial dismissal of John Boorman's Point Blank (1967) for what she felt was its pointless brutality, she later acknowledged it was "intermittently dazzling" with "more energy and invention than Boorman seems to know what to do with ... one comes out exhilarated but bewildered".

However, Kael responded negatively to some action films that she felt pushed what she described as "right wing" or "fascist" agendas. She labeled Don Siegel's Dirty Harry (1971), starring Clint Eastwood, a "right-wing fantasy" and "a remarkably single-minded attack on liberal values." She also called it "fascist medievalism." In an otherwise extremely positive critique of Peckinpah's Straw Dogs, Kael concluded that the controversial director had made "the first American film that is a fascist work of art".

In her negative review of Stanley Kubrick's A Clockwork Orange (1971), Kael explained how she felt some directors who used brutal imagery in their films were desensitizing audiences to violence:

Accusations of homophobia
In his preface to a 1983 interview with Kael for the gay magazine Mandate, Sam Staggs wrote that "she has always carried on a love/hate affair with her gay legions. ... like the bitchiest queen in gay mythology, she has a sharp remark about everything". In the early 1980s, however, and largely in response to her review of the 1981 drama Rich and Famous, Kael faced notable accusations of homophobia. First remarked upon by Stuart Byron in The Village Voice, according to gay writer Craig Seligman the accusations eventually "took on a life of their own and did real damage to her reputation".

In her review, Kael called the straight-themed Rich and Famous "more like a homosexual fantasy," saying that one female character's "affairs, with their masochistic overtones, are creepy, because they don't seem like what a woman would get into". Byron, who "hit the ceiling" after reading the review, was joined by The Celluloid Closet author Vito Russo, who argued that Kael equated promiscuity with homosexuality, "as though straight women have never been promiscuous or been given the permission to be promiscuous."

In response to her review of Rich and Famous, several critics reappraised Kael's earlier reviews of gay-themed films, including a wisecrack Kael made about the gay-themed The Children's Hour: "I always thought this was why lesbians needed sympathy—that there isn't much they can do." Craig Seligman has defended Kael, saying that these remarks showed "enough ease with the topic to be able to crack jokes—in a dark period when other reviewers. ... 'felt that if homosexuality were not a crime it would spread. Kael herself rejected the accusations as "craziness", adding, "I don't see how anybody who took the trouble to check out what I've actually written about movies with homosexual elements in them could believe that stuff."

Nixon quote
In December 1972, a month after U.S. President Richard Nixon was reelected in a landslide victory, Kael gave a lecture at the Modern Language Association, during which she said, "I live in a rather special world. I only know one person who voted for Nixon. Where they [Nixon's other supporters] are I don't know. They're outside my ken. But sometimes when I'm in a theater I can feel them." An article on the lecture in The New York Times included this quote.

Kael was subsequently misquoted as having said, "I can't believe Nixon won. I don't know anyone who voted for him" or a similar sentiment that expressed surprise at the election result. This misquote became an urban legend, and has been cited by conservatives (such as Bernard Goldberg, in his 2001 book Bias) as an example of insularity among the liberal elite. The alleged quote has also been variously attributed to other writers, such as Joan Didion.

Influence
As soon as she began writing for The New Yorker, Kael carried a great deal of influence among fellow critics. In the early 1970s, Cinerama distributors "initiate[d] a policy of individual screenings for each critic because her remarks [during the film] were affecting her fellow critics". In the '70s and '80s, Kael cultivated friendships with a group of young, mostly male critics, some of whom emulated her distinctive writing style. Referred to derisively as the "Paulettes," they came to dominate national film criticism in the 1990s. Critics who have acknowledged Kael's influence include, among many others, A. O. Scott of The New York Times, David Denby and Anthony Lane of The New Yorker, David Edelstein of New York Magazine, Greil Marcus, Elvis Mitchell, Michael Sragow, Armond White, and Stephanie Zacharek of Salon. It was repeatedly alleged that, after her retirement, Kael's "most ardent devotees deliberate[d] with each other [to] forge a common School of Pauline position" before their reviews were written. When confronted with the rumor that she ran "a conspiratorial network of young critics," Kael said she believed that critics imitated her style rather than her actual opinions, stating, "A number of critics take phrases and attitudes from me, and those takings stick out—they're not integral to the writer's temperament or approach".

Asked in 1998 if she thought her criticism had affected the way films were made, Kael deflected the question, stating, "If I say yes, I'm an egotist, and if I say no, I've wasted my life". Several directors' careers were profoundly affected by her, most notably that of Taxi Driver screenwriter Paul Schrader, who was accepted at UCLA Film School's graduate program upon Kael's recommendation. Under her mentoring, Schrader worked as a film critic before taking up screenwriting and directing full time. Derek Malcolm, who worked for several decades as a film critic for The Guardian, said: "If a director was praised by Kael, he or she was generally allowed to work, since the money-men knew there would be similar approbation across a wide field of publications". Alternately, Kael was said to have had the power to prevent filmmakers from working; David Lean said that her criticism of his work "kept him from making a movie for 14 years" (referring to the 14-year break between Ryan's Daughter in 1970 and A Passage to India in 1984).

In 1978, she was awarded the Women in Film Crystal Award for outstanding women who, through their endurance and the excellence of their work, have helped to expand the role of women within the entertainment industry. In his film Willow (1988), George Lucas named one of the villains "General Kael" after the critic. Kael had often reviewed Lucas's work without enthusiasm; in her own (negative) review of Willow, she described the character as an "hommage à moi".

Though he began directing films after she retired, Quentin Tarantino was also influenced by Kael. While growing up, he read her criticism voraciously and said that Kael was "as influential as any director was in helping me develop my aesthetic". Wes Anderson recounted his efforts to screen his film Rushmore for Kael in a 1999 The New York Times article titled "My Private Screening With Pauline Kael". He later wrote to Kael, commenting: "[Y]our thoughts and writing about the movies [have] been a very important source of inspiration for me and my movies, and I hope you don't regret that". In 1997, cultural critic Camille Paglia described Kael as her second favorite critic (behind Parker Tyler), criticizing Kael's commentary on such films as La Dolce Vita and Last Year at Marienbad but also describing Kael as "unfailingly perceptive [...] [her] tart, lively, colloquial style I thought exactly right for a mass form like the movies."

In January 2000, filmmaker Michael Moore posted a recollection of Kael's response to his documentary film Roger & Me (1989). Moore wrote that Kael was incensed that she had to watch Roger & Me in a cinema (after Moore refused to send her a tape of the film for her to watch at home), and she resented Roger & Me winning Best Documentary at the 55th New York Film Critics Circle Awards. Moore said:two weeks later, she wrote a nasty, mean review of my film in The New Yorker. It was OK with me that she didn't like the film, and it didn't bother me that she didn't like the point I was making, or even how I was making it. What was so incredibly appalling and shocking is how she printed outright lies about my movie. I had never experienced such a brazen, bald-faced barrage of disinformation. She tried to rewrite history... Her complete fabrication of the facts was so weird, so out there, so obviously made-up, that my first response was this must be a humor piece she had written... But, of course, she wasn't writing comedy. She was a deadly serious historical revisionist.Kael's career is discussed at length in the documentary For the Love of Movies (2009) by critics whose careers she helped shape, such as Owen Gleiberman and Elvis Mitchell, as well as by those who fought with her, such as Andrew Sarris. The film also shows several of Kael's appearances on PBS, including one alongside Woody Allen. Brian Kellow published a biography about Kael in 2011: A Life in the Dark (Viking Press).

Rob Garver's documentary What She Said: The Art of Pauline Kael was released in 2018. With the voice of Sarah Jessica Parker narrating for Kael, the film is a portrait of the work of the film critic and her influence on the male-dominated worlds of cinema and film criticism.

Quentin Tarantino's final movie is rumoured to be based on her life.

Awards
 1964: John Simon Guggenheim Memorial Foundation Fellowship
 1970: George Polk Award, Criticism
 1974: National Book Award, Arts and Letters, for Deeper into Movies
 1978: Crystal Award, Women in Film Crystal Awards
 1980: Muse Award, New York Women in Film & Television
 1991: Mel Novikoff Award, San Francisco International Film Festival
 1994: Special Award, Los Angeles Film Critics Association Awards
 1995: Writer Award, Gotham Independent Film Awards
 2012: Posthumous induction into the Online Film & Television Association Film Hall of Fame, Behind the Scenes, Film Criticism

Bibliography

Books

 I Lost It at the Movies (1965)
 Kiss Kiss Bang Bang (1968) 
 Going Steady (1969) 
 The Citizen Kane Book (1971) 
 Deeper into Movies (1973) 
 Reeling (1976)
 When the Lights Go Down (1980) 
 5001 Nights at the Movies (1982, revised in 1984 and 1991) 
 Taking It All In (1984) 
 State of the Art (1987) 
 Hooked (1989)
 Movie Love (1991)
 For Keeps (1994)
 Raising Kane, and other essays (1996)

Reviews and essays
 "Trash, Art, and the Movies", essay published in the Feb. 1969 issue of Harper's
  "Raising Kane", book-length essay on the making of Citizen Kane published in the February 20, 1971 and February 27, 1971 issues of The New Yorker
 "Stanley Strangelove", review of A Clockwork Orange from a January 1972 issue of The New Yorker
 "The Man From Dream City", profile of Cary Grant from the July 14, 1975 issue of The New Yorker
 
  Reviews Mrs. Soffel, directed by Gillian Armstrong, and The Cotton Club, directed by Francis Ford Coppola
  Reviews A Passage to India, directed by David Lean
  Reviews Micki and Maude, directed by Blake Edwards; Starman, directed by John Carpenter; The Flamingo Kid, directed by Garry Marshall

See also
 Women in film
 Andrew Sarris
 Auteur theory
 Film criticism
 The New Yorker
 Susan Sontag

References

Works cited
 Brantley, Will, ed. (1996). Conversations with Pauline Kael. University Press of Mississippi. .

Further reading

External links

 
 
 
 
 
 
 
 What She Said: The Art of Pauline Kael on IMDb
 What She Said: The Art of Pauline Kael official site 
 

1919 births
2001 deaths
20th-century American Jews
20th-century American journalists
20th-century American musicians
20th-century American non-fiction writers
20th-century American women writers
American film critics
American people of Polish-Jewish descent
American women critics
American women film critics
American women non-fiction writers
Deaths from Parkinson's disease
Jewish American journalists
Jewish American writers
Journalists from the San Francisco Bay Area
National Book Award winners
National Society of Film Critics Members
Neurological disease deaths in Massachusetts
People from Great Barrington, Massachusetts
People from Petaluma, California
The New Yorker critics
UC Berkeley College of Letters and Science alumni
Writers from the San Francisco Bay Area